Francisco Navarro Fuster (born 20 December 1962) is a Spanish former professional racing cyclist. He rode in the 1985 Tour de France.

Major results
1988
 1st Stage 4 Vuelta a España
 1st Stage 5a Vuelta a Cantabria
1989
 1st Stage 6a (ITT) Volta ao Algarve

Grand Tour general classification results timeline

References

External links
 

1962 births
Living people
Spanish male cyclists
People from Camp de Túria
Sportspeople from the Province of Valencia
Cyclists from the Valencian Community